The 1978 Asia Golf Circuit was the 17th season of golf tournaments that comprised the Asia Golf Circuit.

Taiwan's Hsu Sheng-san was the overall circuit champion for the second time despite being disqualified in the season ending Dunlop International Open for returning an unsigned scorecard, finishing less than six points ahead of compatriot Kuo Chie-Hsiung.

Tournament schedule
The table below shows the 1978 Asian Golf Circuit schedule.

Final standings
The Asia Golf Circuit operated a points based system to determine the overall circuit champion, with points being awarded in each tournament to the leading players. At the end of the season, the player with the most points was declared the circuit champion, and there was a US$80,000 prize pool to be shared between the top players in the points table with the winner taking half. The pool was supposed to be US$100,000, but the Philippines and Thailand did not contribute their share.

References

Asia Golf Circuit
Asia Golf Circuit